Team Véloconcept may refer to:

Team VéloCONCEPT (men's team), a professional cycling team that competes on the UCI Continental Circuits.
Team VéloCONCEPT Women, a professional cycling team that competes on the UCI Women's World Tour.